Le Mesnil-Durdent is a commune in the Seine-Maritime department in the Normandy region in northern France.

Geography

Population

Places of interest
 The church of St. Aubin, dating from the eighteenth century.
 The Jardin des Amouhoques.

See also
Communes of the Seine-Maritime department

References

External links

Website about the village and gardens 

Communes of Seine-Maritime